Bayport is a small village in Nova Scotia, Canada. The community is located in the Lunenburg Municipal District in Lunenburg County.

External links
Riverport District Website

Communities in Lunenburg County, Nova Scotia
General Service Areas in Nova Scotia